Wilma Johanna Stockenström (born 7 August 1933) is a South African writer, translator, and actor. She writes in the Afrikaans language, and along with Sheila Cussons, Elisabeth Eybers, Antjie Krog and Ina Rousseau, she is one of the leading female writers in the language.

Biography
She was born in Napier in the Overberg district of South Africa. After finishing high school, she studied at Stellenbosch University, where she obtained a BA in Drama in 1952. She moved to Pretoria in 1954, and married the Estonian linguist Ants Kirsipuu. Stockenström has lived in Cape Town since 1993.

She is one of a handful of writers to have won the Hertzog prize in two different categories. She won it first for poetry in 1977 and then for fiction in 1991. Her 1981 novel Die kremetartekspedisie was translated into English by the Nobel Prize winner J. M. Coetzee under the title The Expedition to the Baobab Tree. Her work has also been translated into Dutch, French, German, Hebrew, Italian, Turkish and Swedish.

Works

Poetry 
 Vir die bysiende leser, Cape Town: Reijger,  1970
 Spieël van water, Cape Town: Human & Rousseau, 1973
 Van vergetelheid en van glans, Cape Town: Human & Rousseau, 1976
 Monsterverse, Cape Town: Human & Rousseau, 1984
 Die heengaanrefrein, Cape Town: Human & Rousseau, 1988
 Aan die Kaap geskryf, Cape Town: Human & Rousseau, 1994
 Spesmase, Cape Town: Human & Rousseau, 1999
 Die Stomme Aarde: 'n Keur, Cape Town: Human & Rousseau, 2007
 The Wisdom of Water: A Selection (translated by Johann de Lange), Cape Town: Human & Rousseau, 2007
 Skoelapperheuwel, skoelappervrou, New York & Pretoria: Ombondi, 1988/2011
 Hierdie mens, Cape Town: Human & Rousseau, 2013

Prose 
 Uitdraai, Cape Town: Human & Rousseau, 1976
 Eers Linkie dan Johanna, Cape Town: Human & Rousseau, 1979
 Die kremetartekspedisie, Cape Town: Human & Rousseau, 1981
 The Expedition to the Baobab Tree (translated by J. M. Coetzee), Cape Town: Human & Rousseau, 1983; Brooklyn, NY: Archipelago Books, 2015, 
 Kaapse rekwisiete, Cape Town: Human & Rousseau, 1987
 Abjater wat so lag, Cape Town: Human & Rousseau, 1991

Drama 
 Dawid die dik dom kat: ’n kindertoneelstuk, Johannesburg: DALRO, 1971
 Trippens se patatta, Johannesburg: DALRO, 1971
 Laaste middagmaal, Johannesburg: Taurus, 1978

Awards 
 1977 Hertzog Prize for Poetry for Van vergetelheid en van glans
 1984 CNA, Louis Luyt and Ou Mutual Prizes for Monsterverse
 1988 Grinzane Cavour Prize for Spedizione al Baobab 
 1991 WA Hofmeyr and Hertzog Prizes for Abjater wat so lag
 2008 SALA Literary Lifetime Award

References 

South African women novelists
1933 births
Living people
Afrikaans-language writers
Hertzog Prize winners
Stellenbosch University alumni
Hertzog Prize winners for poetry
South African women poets
20th-century South African novelists
20th-century South African poets
20th-century South African women writers
21st-century South African poets
21st-century South African women writers